Random Stuff is a compilation album by American rapper Big B. It was released on October 8, 2006 via Suburban Noize Records. The album includes appearances by several fellow KMK and OPM members and is a CD/DVD set.

CD track listing

DVD track listing

References

2006 video albums
Big B (rapper) albums
2006 compilation albums
Suburban Noize Records albums
Music video compilation albums